Farzad is a given name. Notable people with the name include:

Farzad Ashoubi (born 1985), Iranian football player
Farzad Bazoft (1958–1990), Iranian-born journalist who settled in the United Kingdom in the 1980s
Farzad Bonyadi (born 1959), Iranian professional poker player based in Aliso Viejo, California
Farzad Farzin (born 1981), Iranian singer and actor
Farzad Hatami (born 1986), Iranian professional footballer
Farzad Hosseinkhani (born 1981), Iranian footballer
Farzad Kamangar (1978–2010), 32-year-old Iranian Kurdish teacher and human rights activist executed on May 9, 2010
Farzad Majidi (born 1977), Iranian football player
Farzad Mostashari (born 1968/1969) American health professional of Iranian descent who served as the US National Coordinator for Health IT (2011–2013)
Farzad Nazem (born 1962), former Yahoo!'s chief technology officer and one of its longest-serving executives

Iranian masculine given names